Kupiec is a surname. Notable people with the surname include: 

 Aniela Kupiec (1920–2019), Polish poet
 Ewa Kupiec (born 1964), Polish pianist
 Magdalena Kupiec (born 1976), Polish swimmer

See also
 

Polish-language surnames